Hudson is a town in Caldwell County, North Carolina, United States. The population was 3,776 at the 2010 census. It is part of the Hickory–Lenoir–Morganton Metropolitan Statistical Area.

History
Hudson originated as a sawmill camp, with timber being the initial attraction to the area. Among early settlers to Hudson, were the Hudson brothers, Monroe and Johnny. The name Hudson was selected honoring these two brothers as the name of the community. "Hudsonville" would come into being in 1880, with the "ville" being dropped in 1889 due to mail confusion with Hendersonville. In 1905, Hudson was incorporated as a town.

In 1904, businessman B.B. Hayes of the textile business came to Hudson and established the first big industry, the Hudson Cotten Mill (known as Shuford Mills). The Hudson Cotton Manufacturing Company was listed on the National Register of Historic Places in 2013.

Overview
Hudson is located in the foothills region of western North Carolina. Located in an area once known for its furniture industry, different industries in Hudson today include Shurtape Technologies, BeoCare, Kincaid Furniture, and Sattler Outdura. According to the 2010 census, Hudson has a population of approximately 3,800 people. During the day this jumps to over 11,000 due to those who work in town and those who attend school at Caldwell Community College and other surrounding schools.

Hudson's landmarks, most of which are located near the main street area, include the Hudson Uptown Building (known as the "HUB", site of the former Hudson Elementary school, now an event space), local businesses along main street, and Caldwell Community College from US 321.

The town has two parks. Redwood Park features a playground, swimming pool, basketball and tennis courts, several ballfields, and a dog park. The Hickman Windmill Park & Depot Museum features the Historic Hudson Depot and Red Caboose, as well as a 19th century windmill. Music is often performed in the park, most notably Pickin' in the Park during summer months. On clear days, Hudson offers views of the Blue Ridge Mountains, including Grandfather Mountain. These views can be seen over Hudson Middle School directly off the US Highway 321 Hudson exit. Hudson also hosts Caldwell County's oldest continuous event, The Butterfly Festival, which is held the first Saturday every May with attendance of between 8,000–10,000 people.

Geography
Hudson is located in southern Caldwell County at  (35.845476, -81.490337). It is bordered to the north by the city of Lenoir, the county seat, and to the south by the town of Sawmills. U.S. Route 321, a four-lane highway, runs along the eastern edge of the town, leading northwest into Lenoir and southeast  to Hickory. US 321 Alternate passes through the center of the town as Main Street.

Demographics

2020 census

As of the 2020 United States census, there were 3,780 people, 1,527 households, and 1,048 families residing in the town.

2000 census
As of the census of 2000, there were 3,078 people, 1,324 households, and 933 families residing in the town. The population density was 839.3 people per square mile (323.8/km2). There were 1,400 housing units at an average density of 381.8 per square mile (147.3/km2). The racial makeup of the town was 97.40% White, 0.13% African American, 0.13% Native American, 0.81% Asian, 1.10% from other races, and 0.42% from two or more races. Hispanic or Latino of any race were 1.49% of the population.

There were 1,324 households, out of which 26.4% had children under the age of 18 living with them, 56.3% were married couples living together, 10.3% had a female householder with no husband present, and 29.5% were non-families. 25.5% of all households were made up of individuals, and 10.3% had someone living alone who was 65 years of age or older. The average household size was 2.32 and the average family size was 2.77.

In the town, the population was spread out, with 20.0% under the age of 18, 8.7% from 18 to 24, 29.3% from 25 to 44, 25.5% from 45 to 64, and 16.5% who were 65 years of age or older. The median age was 40 years. For every 100 females, there were 89.9 males. For every 100 females age 18 and over, there were 87.5 males.

The median income for a household in the town was $35,562, and the median income for a family was $42,000. Males had a median income of $29,949 versus $22,727 for females. The per capita income for the town was $20,519. About 3.7% of families and 7.6% of the population were below the poverty line, including none of those under age 18 and 5.6% of those age 65 or over.

Education

High schools
 Caldwell Applied Sciences Academy
 Caldwell Early College High School
 South Caldwell High School

Middle school
 Hudson Middle School

Elementary school
 Hudson Elementary School

Private school
 Heritage Christian School

Independent school
 Moravian Prep

Higher education
 Appalachian Center at Caldwell (located on Hudson Campus of CCC&TI)
 Caldwell Community College & Technical Institute

Media
 WHKY, 1290 WHKY TalkRadio, local radio station
 WJRI, Just Right Radio 100.5 FM/1340 AM WJRI, local radio stations
 WKGX, Classic Hits 104.5 FM/1080 AM WKGX, local radio stations
 WKVS, Hot New Country KICKS 103.3 FM WKVS, local radio station
 WAIZ, "63 Big Ways", AM 630, local radio station featuring 1950s and 1960s oldies

Notable people
 Madison Bumgarner  MLB pitcher, 3x World Series Champion, 2014 World Series MVP 
 Jan Karon  New York Times #1 bestselling author of the Mitford series of novels
 Bob McCreary  former NFL player and furniture business entrepreneur

References

External links
 Town website

Towns in Caldwell County, North Carolina